Living It may refer to:

 Living It (TV series), a CBBC school drama series
 Living It (album), an album by Dorinda Clark-Cole